This is a list of public art in the Somerset county of England. This list applies only to works of public art on permanent display in an outdoor public space. For example, this does not include artworks in museums.

The ceremonial county of Somerset consists of a non-metropolitan county, administered by Somerset County Council, which is divided into four districts, and two unitary authorities. The districts of Somerset are Somerset West and Taunton, South Somerset, Mendip and Sedgemoor. The two administratively independent unitary authorities, which were established on 1 April 1996 following the breakup of the county of Avon, are North Somerset and Bath and North East Somerset. These unitary authorities include areas that were once part of Somerset before the creation of Avon in 1974.

Public art is art in any media that has been planned and executed with the intention of being staged in the physical public domain, usually outside and accessible to all. Public art is significant within the art world, amongst curators, commissioning bodies and practitioners of public art, to whom it signifies a working practice of site specificity, community involvement and collaboration. Public art may include any art which is exhibited in a public space including publicly accessible buildings, but often it is not that simple. Rather, the relationship between the content and audience, what the art is saying and to whom, is just as important if not more important than its physical location.

Bath and North East Somerset 

Bath and North East Somerset (commonly referred to as BANES or B&NES) is a unitary authority created on 1 April 1996, following the abolition of the County of Avon. BANES stretches from the outskirts of Bristol, south into the Mendip Hills and east to the southern Cotswold Hills and Wiltshire border. The city of Bath is the principal settlement in the district, but BANES also covers Keynsham, Midsomer Norton, Radstock and the Chew Valley. BANES has a population of 170,000, about half of whom live in Bath, making it 12 times more densely populated than the rest of the district.

Mendip 

Mendip is a local government district which covers a largely rural area of  ranging from the Mendip Hills through on to the Somerset Levels. It has a population of approximately 11,000. The administrative centre of the district is Shepton Mallet.

North Somerset 

North Somerset is a unitary authority which is administered independently of the non-metropolitan county of Somerset. Its administrative headquarters are located in the town hall of Weston-super-Mare, and has a resident population of 193,000 living in 85,000 households.

Sedgemoor 

Sedgemoor district is a low-lying area of land close to sea level between the Quantock and Mendip hills, historically largely marsh (or moor). It contains the bulk of the area also known as the Somerset Levels, including Europe's oldest known engineered roadway, the Sweet Track.

South Somerset 

The district has a population of about 158,000, and has Yeovil as its administrative centre.

Somerset West and Taunton 

Somerset West and Taunton has borough status.
The major settlements are the town of Taunton, where around 60,000 of the population live, Minehead which has population 10,000.

References 

Somerset
Arts in Somerset
Somerset-related lists